Yarica is a genus of fishes in the family Apogonidae, the cardinalfishes.

Species
The recognized species in this genus are:
 Yarica hyalosoma (Bleeker, 1852) (humpbacked cardinalfish)
 Yarica torresiensis (Castelnau, 1875)

References

Apogoninae
Marine fish genera
Taxa named by Gilbert Percy Whitley